Nathan Mark Fong (March 16, 1959 – March 30, 2020) was a Canadian chef, food stylist, media personality and activist.

Early life and education

Nathan Mark Fong was born in West Vancouver on March 16, 1959. His parents were Edna and Robert Fong. He had four siblings and was the oldest. The Fong's owned an IGA grocery store in the Dundarave neighborhood of West Vancouver. When he was a teenager, Fong worked at the grocery store as a stocker.

Fong attended the University of British Columbia for commerce. He never completed his degree, deciding to study cooking at the Dubrulle Culinary Institute at the Art Institute of Vancouver. His classmates included Rob Feenie and Barbara-Jo McIntosh.

Career in food and personal life

Fong started a catering company after graduating from Dubrulle. He transitioned into food styling soon thereafter. He styled food for photo shoots and commercials, including for McDonald's, Coca-Cola, Samsung, A&W, and White Spot. In 1998, Fong won the first International Association of Culinary Professionals Julia Child Award of Excellence for food styling. He won the Food Network Challenge's Superstar Foodstylist Competition in 2009.

Since 2012, Fong served as chef for the British Columbian government. He represented the province at tourism events, trade shows, international events and diplomatic receptions. He appeared regularly on the Today show during the show's 2010 Winter Olympics programming, showcasing British Columbian cuisine and food culture. In 2016, he participated in a reception for the Prince William, Duke of Cambridge and Catherine, Duchess of Cambridge. Fong persuaded Catherine to taste raw geoduck, while Prince William declined. That same year, he married his partner Michel Chicoine on January 16.

For decades Fong hosted his TV show "Fong on Food" on Global Television Network and a weekly radio show by the same name. He was the executive chef producer of the BC Seafood Festival. He was a columnist for the Vancouver Sun and also contributed to Enroute, Bon Appetit, NUVO, Men's Health, Cooking Light and Fine Cooking.

Activism

Fong was HIV positive, which inspired him to become involved in HIV fundraising and pro-LGBTQ causes. In 2002, Fong created the Passions Gala, an annual wine and food event that benefited the Dr. Peter AIDS Foundation. , the event has raised over $1.6 million for the Foundation. He was nominated for the Gemini Humanitarian Award in 2006 for his work with the Dr. Peter Centre. In 2006, he was awarded the BCPWA/Positive Living Society's AccolAIDS Philanthropy Award.

Later life and death

Fong had diabetes and struggled to control it. He would often stop eating when he was feeling depressed, something he experienced with in the weeks prior to his death. In 2020, he also saw business plummet due to the cancelation of events in the wake of COVID-19 shelter in place orders. He visited Scottsdale, Arizona before travel bans and shelter-in-place went into effect and returned to Vancouver where he quarantined at his home.

The last week of March 2020, Fong fainted and fell, hitting his head. Fong was found dead, on March 30, at his home in Vancouver by Chicoine. Officially it has been said that he died of a suspected heart attack

References

External links
"Chefs Remember Beloved Vancouver Foodie Nathan Fong" from Montecristo

1959 births
2020 deaths
Businesspeople from British Columbia
Journalists from British Columbia
Writers from British Columbia
People from West Vancouver
Canadian television chefs
Canadian talk radio hosts
Canadian LGBT journalists
Vancouver Sun people
Canadian male journalists
Canadian columnists
Global Television Network people
Canadian LGBT rights activists
Canadian gay writers
Canadian LGBT businesspeople
Canadian LGBT broadcasters
HIV/AIDS activists
People with HIV/AIDS
21st-century Canadian male writers
21st-century Canadian non-fiction writers
21st-century Canadian journalists
Canadian male chefs
Chefs from Vancouver
21st-century Canadian LGBT people